The 2008 Grand Prix de Denain was the 50th edition of the Grand Prix de Denain cycle race and was held on 17 April 2008. The race started in Raismes and finished in Denain. The race was won by Edvald Boasson Hagen.

General classification

References

2008
2008 in road cycling
2008 in French sport
April 2008 sports events in France